British Rail allocated Class 499 to a fleet of six luggage vans used in electric multiple unit formations on boat train services between London and Dover. They were allocated Southern Region class TLV (meaning Trailer Luggage Van).

They were converted from former Brake Gangwayed (BG) vehicles in 1968 to supplement the Class 419 Motor Luggage Van fleet. However, following the decline of boat train traffic, they were all stored in 1975. After a period in use as match wagons for transferring new Class 432 and 491 units from York Works, they were all taken into departmental stock initially as stores vans, but later as breakdown train tool vans.

Registered London Underground Stock

From 1994, Railtrack allocated the Class 499 designation on TOPS to London Underground electric multiple units that operate on its lines. This does not involve any renumbering of the stock involved, and is only for electronic recording purposes.

References

499
Train-related introductions in 1958